Felton is a surname. Notable people with the surname include:

Alfred Felton, Australian philanthropist
Charles N. Felton, American politician
Cornelius Conway Felton, American university president
Demetric Felton (born 1998), American football player
Eric Felton, American football player
Felix Felton, British actor
Gene Felton (1936–2020), American race car driver
George E. Felton, British Computer Scientist
Happy Felton, American entertainer
John Felton (assassin), English assassin of George Villiers, 1st Duke of Buckingham
John Felton (martyr), English Catholic martyr
John B. Felton, Mayor of Oakland, California (1869–1970)
Katharine Felton, American social service innovator
Leo Felton, American white supremacist
Lindsay Felton, American actress
Nicholas Felton (graphic designer), American graphic designer
Nicholas Felton (bishop), English academic and bishop
Raymond Felton, American basketball player
Rebecca Latimer Felton, American teacher, writer and U. S. Senator for one day 
Samuel Morse Felton, Sr., American railroad executive
Samuel Morse Felton, Jr., American railroad executive
Terry Felton, American baseball player
Tom Felton, actor notable for playing Draco Malfoy in the Harry Potter films
Verna Felton, American actress
William Harrell Felton, American politician
William Felton (composer), British composer

Fictional characters:
Beau Felton, fictional character from Homicide: Life on the Street